Khanpur may refer to:

Places in India
 Khanpur, Delhi, a neighbourhood in Delhi
 Khanpur, Gujarat, a town in Gujarat
 Khanpur, Phillaur, a village in Jalandhar district, Punjab
 Khanpur, Kapurthala, a village in Kapurthala district, Punjab
 Khanpur, Ludhiana West, a village in Ludhiana district, Punjab
 Khanpur, Jhalawar, a town in Jhalawar district, Rajasthan
 Khanpur (Rajasthan Assembly constituency)
 Khanpur, Uttar Pradesh, a town in Bulandshahr district, in Uttar Pradesh
 Khanpur, Ghazipur, a village in Ghazipur district, Uttar Pradesh
 Khanpur J. Aurangabad, a village in Shahjahanpur district, Uttar Pradesh
 Khanpur, Uttarakhand, a community development block of Uttarakhand
 Khanpur (Uttarakhand Assembly constituency)
 Khanpur, Chanditala-II, a village in Hooghly district, West Bengal
 Khanpur, Murshidabad, a census town in West Bengal

Places in Pakistan
 Khanpur, Khyber Pakhtunkhwa, a town and tehsil in Haripur district, Khyber Pakhtunkhwa
 Khanpur Dam, a dam located near the town
 Khanpur, Lower Dir, a union council in Lower Dir District, Khyber Pakhtunkhwa
 Khanpur, Rahim Yar Khan, a city in the Punjab Province of Pakistan
 Khanpur railway station
 Khanpur, Chakwal, a town in Chakwal District, Punjab
 Khanpur, Sindh, a town in Shikarpur District, Sindh

Other uses
 Khanpur (crater), a crater on Mars

See also
 
 Kanpur (disambiguation)
 Khanapur (disambiguation)
 Khanpur–Chachran Railway, Pakistan
 Khanpur Tehsil (disambiguation)